was a Japanese politician who was a member of Liberal Democratic Party, serving in the House of Representatives in the Diet of Japan. On September 3, 2007, due to the financial scandal, he resigned as Minister of Agriculture just eight days after he was appointed to the post. Masatoshi Wakabayashi became new Minister of Agriculture, Forestry and Fisheries again.

A native of Yonezawa, Yamagata and graduate of Chuo University, he was elected to the first of his three terms in the assembly of Yamagata Prefecture in 1975 and then to the House of Representatives for the first time in 1986. He lost his seat in 1993 but was re-elected three years later.

On December 27, 2019, Endo died in a hospital in Yamagata Prefecture from interstitial pneumonia.

References

External links 
 Official website in Japanese.

1938 births
2019 deaths
Chuo University alumni
Members of the House of Representatives (Japan)
Ministers of Agriculture, Forestry and Fisheries of Japan
People from Yamagata Prefecture
Liberal Democratic Party (Japan) politicians
Deaths from pneumonia in Japan